Edward W. Clark Generating Station is a 1,102 megawatt plant owned by Nevada Power on  located in the Las Vegas Valley town of Whitney, Nevada, USA. The plant consists of 19 units and first went into service in 1954 as "Nevada Power’s first power plant".

Units
75-kW photovoltaic system developed jointly with the University of Nevada and the National Renewable Energy Laboratory
1 General Electric MS-7000 gas-fired (1973)
2 Mitsubishi steam recycled heat gas-fired turbine generators
12 50-MW FT8 Pratt & Whitney gas-fired peaking units (2008)

Notes 

Energy infrastructure completed in 1954
Energy infrastructure completed in 1973
Energy infrastructure completed in 2008
Buildings and structures in Clark County, Nevada
Natural gas-fired power stations in Nevada
Solar power stations in Nevada